National Highway 753F, commonly referred to as NH 753F is a national highway in  India. It is a spur road of National Highway 53. NH-753F traverses the state of Maharashtra in India.

Route 
Jalgaon, Pahur, Fardapur, Ajanta, Sillod, Phulambri, Aurangabad, Newasa, Wadala Bahiroba, Ghodegaon, Ahmednagar, Shirur, Ranjangaon, Shikrapur, Pune, Paud, Mulshi, Tamhini, Nijampur, Mangaon, Mhasla, Dighi Port .

Junctions  

  Terminal near Jalgaon.
  near Mangaon.
 NH 166C Terminal near Dighi Port.

See also 

 List of National Highways in India
 List of National Highways in India by state

References

External links 

 NH 753F on OpenStreetMap

National highways in India
National Highways in Maharashtra